Run Run may refer to:
 Run Run Shaw, Hong Kong entertainment mogul and philanthropist
 "Run Run", a song on Bluebird of Happiness (album) by Toni Braxton